William Watson (31 December 1893 – 1962) was a professional footballer who played as a wing half for Huddersfield Town all his career from 1912 to 1927.

His sons Willy (died 23 April 2004 in South Africa) and Albert (died 2009 in Sunderland) were on Town's playing staff in later years.

Honours
Huddersfield Town
 FA Cup: 1921–22
 First Division (3): 1923–24, 1924–25, 1925–26
 FA Charity Shield: 1922

References

1893 births
1962 deaths
People from Bolton upon Dearne
English footballers
English Football League players
Association football wing halves
Huddersfield Town A.F.C. players
Footballers from Yorkshire
FA Cup Final players